Addison Holley (born May 18, 2000) is a Canadian actress who has had starring roles in several television series. 

Holley was born in Burlington, Ontario. In 2016, she was nominated for the Daytime Emmy Award for Outstanding Performer in a Children's Series for her work in Annedroids. She is the voice of the title character in Ella the Elephant, Hazel in Little Charmers, and Amaya/Owlette in PJ Masks. Her younger sister, Kallan, was the voice of Skye from PAW Patrol. Filmography
Live-action roles
 Annedroids - Anne
 Baxter - Dana McNab
 Cold Blood - Jill Camm (episode: "Cop Killer")
 Cyborg Soldier - Katie
 My Babysitter's a Vampire - Anastasia (vampire)
 Really Me - Jenny Donkers
 The Red Maple Leaf - Frankie Palermo
 Rosie Takes the Train - Young Rosie
 Shelby - Haley
 Trapped: The Alex Cooper Story - Alex Cooper

Animated roles
 Caillou - Layla
 Daniel Tiger's Neighborhood - Miss Elaina (2012-2020, seasons 1-4)
 Doodlebops Rockin' Road Show - Alice
 Ella the Elephant - Ella
 Grojband - Kate Persky
 Little Charmers - Hazel Charming
 Monster Math Squad - Sally
 My Big Big Friend - Lili
 PAW Patrol - Julia (seasons 1-4), The Cheetah
 Peg + Cat - Tessa
 PJ Masks - Amaya/Owlette
 Thomas & Friends: All Engines Go! - Riff (US)
 Thomas & Friends: Race for the Sodor Cup - Riff (US/UK; Original dub)
 True and the Rainbow Kingdom - Day Queen
 Wild Kratts - Katie
 Wishenpoof! - Bianca
 The ZhuZhus'' - Jessica Beeker

References

External links

2000 births
Actresses from Ontario
Canadian child actresses
Canadian film actresses
Canadian television actresses
Canadian voice actresses
Living people
People from Burlington, Ontario